Çayönü is a village in the Çayırlı District, Erzincan Province, Turkey. The village is populated by Kurds and had a population of 85 in 2021.

The hamlets of Emirkomu, Kahmut and Karamelik are attached to the village.

References 

Villages in Çayırlı District
Kurdish settlements in Erzincan Province